Xenofreini is a tribe of longhorn beetles of the subfamily Lamiinae.

Taxonomy
 Curiofrea
 Oroxenofrea
 Xenofrea

References

Lamiinae